Jakob Geis, stage name Papa Geis (27 December 1840, in Munich – 3 March 1908, in Munich) was a German performer, folksinger, and musical director. He was considered a master of Bavarian cuplés. The dramatist and director Jacob Geis was his grandchild.

Originally he wanted to become a Catholic priest. But at the age of 26, he broke off his theological studies and started a stage career as a comedian in Vienna. He wore only black clothes, a bit like a Catholic priest. Often he was greeted therefore as a Father. His stage name Papa Geis means Daddy Geis.

In 1878 he started his own musical and comedian group, named Gesellschaft Geis. His cuplés reflect a piece of cultural history of Munich.

Discography 
 CD "Rare Schellacks - München: Volkssänger", by Trikont (Best.Nr. US 0199), including the "Bachstelzenlied" from Papa Geis.

1902 Papa Geis recorded five couplés by "Gramophone Co.":
 G&T 42 230 (mx. 594) Kalauer-Couplet (music: Julius Einödshofer)
 G&T 42 231 (mx. 596) Daradl-Dadl (text: Krakauer)
 G&T 42 232 (mx. 593) Travestie über das "Bachstelzenlied" (Tit-willow) (music: W.S.Gilbert)
 G&T 42 233 (mx. 592) Couplet mit Opern-Refrain
 G&T 42 234 (mx. 594) Durchs Schlüsselloch (text: Verney)

Selected bibliography 
 Jakob Geis: Selbstbiographie. Typoskript München 1905.

Further reading 
 Jakob Geis - Münchner Volkssänger und Wirt vom „Oberpollinger“ zum 150. Geburtstag. Aus dem historischen Kalender. In: Charivari 16, 1990, 12, S. 75.
 Susanne von Goessel: Münchener Volkssänger - Unterhaltung für Alle. In: Till, Wolfgang (Hrsg.): Karl Valentin – Volkssänger? Dadaist? [Katalog zur] Ausstellung zum 100. Geburtstag Karl Valentins. München, Schirmer/Mosel 1982, S. 26 ff.
 Berthold Leimbach: Tondokumente der Kleinkunst und ihre Interpreten 1898 - 1945, Göttingen, im Selbstverlag, 1991, unpaginiert.
 Joseph Maria Lutz: Die Münchner Volkssänger. Ein Erinnerungsbuch an die gute alte Zeit. Nach einer Sammlung von Erwin Münz. München 1956
 Claudia Preis: Der Unterhaltungskünstler Jakob „Papa“ Geis im Umfeld der Münchner Volkssängerszene. München 2005, (München, Univ., Magisterarbeit).
 Claudia Preis: Volkssängerei in München 1870-1930. Zur Produktion von Unterhaltungskultur in der Stadt. Diss. München 2010, online (PDF; 869 kB)
 Ludwig M. Schneider: Die populäre Kritik an Staat und Gesellschaft in München (1886-1914). Ein Beitrag zur Vorgeschichte der Münchner Revolution von 1918/19. Kommissionsbuchhandlung Wölfle, München 1975 (= Miscellanea Bavarica Monacensia, Heft 61).
 Wolfgang Till (Hrsg.): Karl Valentin – Volkssänger? Dadaist?. [Katalog zur] Ausstellung zum 100. Geburtstag Karl Valentins. München, Schirmer/Mosel 1982.

References

External links 
 Jakob Geis in Bayerisches Musiker-Lexikon Online (BMLO)

German folk singers
German male comedians
1840 births
1908 deaths
Musicians from Munich